Yaghan, Yagán or Yahgan may refer to:
 Yahgan people, an ethnic group of Argentina and Chile
 Yahgan language, their language
 Yaghan (dog), an extinct domesticated fox

See also 
 Yagan (disambiguation)
 Yagha, a province of Burkina Faso
 Yakan (disambiguation)

Language and nationality disambiguation pages